PAZZ Festival is a theatre festival in Germany.

External links
Festival website

Theatre festivals in Germany